Nicholas or Nick Rowe may refer to:

Nicholas Rowe (writer) (1674–1718), English dramatist and Poet Laureate
James N. Rowe or Nick Rowe (1938–1989), American military officer and prisoner of war during the Vietnam War
Nicholas Rowe (actor) (born 1966), British actor
Nicholas Rowe (producer), American music producer
Nick Rowe, guitarist with Bloodsimple from 2002 to 2008